Frank Patrick Njambe (born 24 October 1987) is a Cameroonian footballer who plays as a midfielder. He played in the Bundesliga for Borussia Dortmund.

Career
Njambe began his career with Union Douala and in the summer of 2004 joined one of Germany's top clubs, Borussia Dortmund. It would be several years before he played his first professional game, which came on 29 September 2007 against Karlsruher SC. Njambe was called to join Cameroonian Olympics team to prepare for Olympic Games 2008 in China. But unfortunately he got injured and could not attend that event. He needed several months to recover and at the end could not renew his contract with Borussia Dortmund. To keep fit, he signed a two years contract with KFC Uerdingen 05, which ended on 30 June 2012.

Coaching career
Njambe went to Cameroon and founded a football school to develop young talent in Douala.

Honours
2007: U-23 Africa Champion

References

External links
 Frank Patrick Njambe at kicker.de 

1987 births
Living people
Cameroonian footballers
Borussia Dortmund players
Borussia Dortmund II players
KFC Uerdingen 05 players
Bundesliga players
SC Wiedenbrück 2000 players
Association football midfielders